Ceroplesis rubrocincta is a species of beetle in the family Cerambycidae. It was described by Hintz in 1911. It is known from Kenya, the Democratic Republic of the Congo, and Tanzania.

References

rubrocincta
Beetles described in 1911